Fatemeh Pahlavi (30 October 1928 – 2 June 1987) was Reza Shah Pahlavi's tenth child and half-sister of Mohammad Reza Pahlavi. She was a member of the Pahlavi dynasty.

Early life and education
Fatemeh Pahlavi was born in Tehran on 30 October 1928. She was the tenth child of Reza Shah and his fourth and last wife, Esmat Dowlatshahi. Her mother was from the Qajar dynasty and married Reza Shah in 1923. Fatemeh was the full-sister of Abdul Reza Pahlavi, Ahmad Reza Pahlavi, Mahmoud Reza Pahlavi and Hamid Reza Pahlavi.

She and her brothers lived at the Marble Palace in Tehran with their parents.

Activities

During the reign of her half-brother, Mohammad Reza Pahlavi, Fatemeh Pahlavi owned a bowling club and dealt with business, having shares in the firms involved in construction, vegetable oil production and engineering. She also had a fortune of some $500 million during that time. Her fortune came from the "commissions" extracted from military contractors by her second husband, Mohammad Amir Khatami. Pahlavi also involved in activities concerning higher education in Iran and had shares in an Iranian football team, Persepolis F.C.

Personal life
Fatemeh Pahlavi married twice. She married Vincent Lee Hillyer (1924 – 7 July 1999) in a civil ceremony in Civitavecchia, Italy, on 13 April 1950. Hillyer converted to Islam. On 10 May they wed in a religious ceremony at Iran's embassy in Paris. Hillyer was a friend of her brother Abdul Reza Pahlavi. Fatemeh and Hillyer met in Iran during the latter's visit to the country. The marriage was not fully endorsed by Shah Mohammad Reza, probably due to negative reactions in Iran. They had three children, two sons, Kayvan and Dariush, and one daughter, Rana, who died in an accidental fall in infancy in 1954. They divorced in September 1959.

After divorcing Hillyer, she married Mohammad Amir Khatami, the commanding general of Iran's air force, on 22 November 1959. The shah and his then fiancée Farah Diba attended the wedding ceremony. They had two sons, Kambiz (born 1961) and Ramin (born 1967), and a daughter, Pari (born 1962).

Pahlavi took courses from a British pilot to learn to fly a helicopter. After she completed the first solo flight she gifted her trainer with a watch, Omega Speedmaster, which had been given to the Shah by the Apollo 11 astronauts in 1969 when they visited Iran as part of a tour to celebrate the first Moon landing. In early 2021 the watch was sold for £18,000 at auction.

Later years and death
Pahlavi left Iran before the 1979 revolution. During her last years, she was living in London.

Pahlavi died at the age of 58 in London on 2 June 1987. She was survived by her four sons.

Honours

National
  Dame Grand Cordon Imperial Order of the Pleiades, 2nd Class

Foreign
  Grand Cross of the Order of Merit of the Federal Republic of Germany (21 October 1965).

References

External links

20th-century Iranian businesspeople
20th-century Iranian women
1928 births
1987 deaths
Daughters of kings
Exiles of the Iranian Revolution in the United Kingdom
Grand Crosses 1st class of the Order of Merit of the Federal Republic of Germany
Iranian emigrants to the United Kingdom
Iranian women in business
Mazandarani people
Pahlavi princesses